The People's Conscience Party, better known by its abbreviation, Hanura, is a political party in Indonesia. It was established following a meeting in Jakarta on 13–14 December 2006 and first headed by former Indonesian National Armed Forces commander Wiranto. The party lost its seats in parliament after a poor performance in the 2019 general election.

Background
After being eliminated in the first round of the 2004 Indonesian presidential election, Wiranto was "traumatized" by his defeat and decided not to run for the presidency without his own political vehicle. He resigned from Golkar Party in 2006 and established Hanura, targeting voters who had supported him in 2004. The party conducted a door-to-door grassroots campaign. The basis of its support is in West Java, Gorontalo, South Sulawesi, North Sulawesi, West Nusa Tenggara and Bali The party's target in the 2004 elections was 15 percent of the vote.

The result of the Indonesian legislative election, 2009 was announced on 9 May 2009. Hanura won 3.77 percent of the national vote, which translated into 18 legislative seats. The party had supported Golkar chairman Jusuf Kalla for the presidency, in which both parties lost out to the Indonesian Democratic Party-Struggle and the Democratic Party. Hanura chairman Wiranto was his vice-presidential candidate, despite Wiranto's previous statement that he would not settle for the vice-presidency. Following cabinet reshuffle in July 2016, Wiranto was appointed as coordinating minister for politics, legal and security affairs, prompting the party to hold a convention to select Wiranto's successor as party chairman.

In Indonesia's 2019 general election, Hanura won only 1.54% of the vote and lost its 16 seats in the national parliament.

On 18 December 2019, Wiranto resigned as chairman of the Hanura Board of Trustees, saying he wanted to focus on his appointment as chairman of the Presidential Advisory Council. He denied having been pushed out of the party, but he acknowledged the party had suffered internal conflict and that he was not invited to a recent national conference.

List of chairmen

Election results

Legislative election results

Presidential election results

References

 
2006 establishments in Indonesia
Pancasila political parties
Political parties established in 2006
Political parties in Indonesia